Richard Courtenay (died 15 September 1415) was an English prelate and university chancellor, who served as Bishop of Norwich from 1413 to 1415.

Life
Courtenay was a son of Sir Philip Courtenay of Powderham Castle near Exeter, and a grandson of Hugh de Courtenay, 10th Earl of Devon (died 1377). He was a nephew of William Courtenay, archbishop of Canterbury, and a descendant of King Edward I of England. From an early age he was renowned for his intellect and personal beauty. He was nicknamed "the flower of Devon".

Educated at Exeter College, Oxford, Courtenay entered the church, where his advance was rapid. He held several prebends, was Dean of St Asaph and then Dean of Wells, and became Bishop of Norwich in June 1413, being consecrated on 17 September 1413.

As Chancellor of the University of Oxford, an office to which Courtenay was elected more than once, Courtenay asserted the independence of the University against Thomas Arundel, Archbishop of Canterbury, in 1411; but the Archbishop, supported by King Henry IV and Antipope John XXIII, eventually triumphed.

Courtenay was a close friend of King Henry V both before and after he came to the throne; and in 1413, immediately after Henry's accession, he was made treasurer of the royal household. On two occasions he went on diplomatic errands to France, and he was also employed by Henry on public business at home. Having accompanied the king to Harfleur in August 1415, Courtenay succumbed to dysentery and died about 15 September 1415. The closeness of the attachment has led to speculation that Courtenay may have played a critical role in mentoring Henry to become a respected monarch, and that his relationship with Henry may have been more than a friendship.

Family
Another member of this family was Peter Courtenay (died 1492), a grandnephew of Richard. He also attained high position in the English Church.

Citations

References
 
 
 
 

14th-century births
Year of birth unknown
1415 deaths
Alumni of Exeter College, Oxford
English theologians
Medieval English diplomats
Chancellors of the University of Oxford
Bishops of Norwich
Deans of St Asaph
Deans of Wells
Richard Courtenay
15th-century English Roman Catholic bishops
Masters of the Jewel Office
15th-century diplomats